Calcium-dependent secretion activator 2 is a protein that in humans is encoded by the CADPS2 gene.

Function 

This gene encodes a member of the calcium-dependent activator of secretion (CAPS) protein family, which are calcium-binding proteins that regulate the exocytosis of synaptic and dense-core vesicles in neurons and neuroendocrine cells.

Interactions 
This gene interacts with brain-derived neurotrophic factor.

Clinical significance 

Cadps2 has been linked to autism and is in the 7q autism susceptibility locus (AUTS1). However, the finding of aberrant CADPS2 splicing was not found to be significant in another study.

A knockout mouse model was found to have autistic-like characteristics.

CADPS2 has been linked to human and mouse brain structure in two large genomic studies.

References

External links

Further reading